Extize (EXT!ZE) is a Franco-German gothic electronic band from Heidelberg, Germany.

Discography

Albums
 FallOut Nation (2009/Trisol)
 Paradize 2069 (2011/Trisol)
 Anarchy Engineers (2012/Future Fame)

Singles
 Hellektrostar Ep (2009/Trisol)
 Gothic Pussy (2010/Trisol)
 Arschloch EP (2012/Trisol)

Music Videos
 Gothic Pussy (2010)
 HeadQuake (2011)
 Freed From Desire (Gala Tribute) (2011)
 Arschloch Alarm (2012)
 Kiss & Kill (2013)

Compilations
 Extreme Traumfänger 7 (2008)
 Extreme Schwarze Nacht 3 (2008)
 Extreme Störfrequenz 1 (2009)
 Extreme Sündenfall 7 (2009)
 Orkus Compilation 54 (2009)
 Gothic Compilation 65 (2009)
 Sonic Seducer Cold Hands 100 (2010)
 Endzeit Bunkertracks V (2010)
 Amphi Festival 2010 (2010)
 Endzeit Bunkertracks VI (2012)
 Nachtaktiv Sampler Dezember 2012 (2012)
 Nachtaktiv Sampler Februar 2013 (2013)

Remixes
 Aggressionslevel 4.0 - Laboratory of Joy (EXT!ZE EXTASE-X RMX)
 Genetic Disorder - Anästhetikum (Painless Mix by EXTIZE)
 PS Kabelsalat - Das Ende der Welt (EXT!ZE REMIX FORM H3LL)
 Santa Hates You - Z.O.M.B.I.E (REAN!MATED by EXT!ZE)
 Suono - And the party never dies (HarderLouderStronger RMX by EXT!ZE)
 V2A - Intruder Alert (Dronestep RMX by EXT!ZE)
 V2A - Jesus Loves You (Extize's Raving Christ RMX)
 Weena Morloch - Herz und Faust (F!STED by EXT!ZE)

External links 
 

German electronic music groups